The Diocese of Ambositra is a Roman Catholic Diocese under the Archdiocese of Fianarantsoa in Madagascar. It is based in the town of Ambositra and was erected on 3 June 1999. It performs the Latin Rite. As of 2004, the diocese population was about 334,828, with 48.1% Catholic. 57 priests were in the Diocese as of 2004 for a ratio of 5,874 Catholics for every 1 Priest. Fidelis Rakotonarivo, SJ has been the Bishop of the Diocese since June 2005.

Bishops

Ordinaries
Fulgence Rabemahafaly (3 June 1999 - 1 October 2002), appointed Archbishop of Fianarantsoa
Fidelis Rakotonarivo, S.J. (24 Jun 2005 -)

Statistics in 2016

Other priest of this diocese who became bishop
Marcellin Randriamamonjy, appointed Bishop of Fenoarivo Atsinanana in 2009

External links
 Catholic-hierarchy.org profile of Ambositra Diocese

Roman Catholic dioceses in Madagascar
1999 establishments in Madagascar
Roman Catholic Ecclesiastical Province of Fianarantsoa